Chrysiliou is a small village in Cyprus, east of Morphou. De facto, it is under the control of Northern Cyprus. According to Cyprus Republic, is a quarter of Morphou.

References

Parishes of Morphou Municipality
Populated places in Güzelyurt District